Leslie Cichocki (born 28 December 1988) is an American Paralympic swimmer who competes in international level events. She was the United States' first intellectually impaired swimmer to participate in the Summer Paralympics when she was selected for the United States' 2016 Summer Paralympics team.

References

1988 births
Living people
People from Oak Lawn, Illinois
People from Palos Hills, Illinois
Paralympic swimmers of the United States
Swimmers at the 2016 Summer Paralympics
People with epilepsy
Medalists at the 2015 Parapan American Games
Medalists at the 2019 Parapan American Games
American female backstroke swimmers
American female butterfly swimmers
American female freestyle swimmers
S14-classified Paralympic swimmers